"Maybe for Sure" is a 1989 song by the American singer Debbie Harry, released as a single from her third solo album Def, Dumb & Blonde.

Song information
"Maybe For Sure" was written during Harry's time with the band Blondie. Despite being produced by Blondie's producer Mike Chapman, the single was not a success, peaking at number 89 in the UK and was not released at all in the US.

The song itself is a reworked version of the song "Angel's Song", from the 1983 animated film Rock & Rule, which was written by Debbie Harry and Chris Stein. A remixed version of the track called the "Tunguska Event 7" mix" was later featured on the US charity album Just Say Da (Volume IV Of Just Say Yes).

Track listing 
All tracks written by Deborah Harry & Chris Stein.

UK 7", 7" Picture Disc & Cassette
 "Maybe for Sure"  - 4:10 
 "Get Your Way" - 6:11

UK 12"
 "Maybe for Sure" - 5:04 
 "Get Your Way" - 6:11
 "End of the Run" - 7:03

UK CD
 "Maybe for Sure" - 4:10 
 "Get Your Way" - 6:11
 "End of the Run" - 7:03

Charts

References

1989 songs
1990 singles
Chrysalis Records singles
Debbie Harry songs
Song recordings produced by Mike Chapman
Songs written by Chris Stein
Songs written by Debbie Harry